The People's Friend is a British weekly magazine founded by John Leng on 13 January 1869 as an offshoot of The People's Journal and currently published by D. C. Thomson & Co. Ltd. Its tagline is "The famous story magazine". It was originally a monthly magazine but became a weekly magazine in 1870, and had its first illustrated cover on 11 May 1946.

Annie S. Swan wrote for the magazine. The current editor is Angela Gilchrist.

The magazine is principally aimed at older women. Each issue contains at least seven self-contained short stories and two serials (frequently more), a craft project (usually knitting or sewing) and various factual articles, one of which is a piece on a particular town. Pets, family and traditions are also common themes. During World War 1, the focus of the magazine shifted to women.

The magazine holds an annual craft competition called "The Love Darg" (a Scots term for a day's work done without asking payment) in which readers are asked to make toys and garments. After judging, the entries are distributed to charities.

The magazine's geographical location in Dundee is reflected in a general bias toward Scottish subjects. The main front cover image is invariably a painting of a picturesque location somewhere in Britain or Ireland, and readers can also buy prints of these pictures. The paintings are made by a variety of artists but are credited to the collective pseudonym J. Campbell Kerr, which is also used for the "Round Britain" feature within the magazine.

References

External links
 

1869 establishments in the United Kingdom
Women's magazines published in the United Kingdom
Weekly magazines published in the United Kingdom
Magazines established in 1869
Mass media in Dundee